Penitents is a Barcelona Metro station, named after the Vallcarca i els Penitents neighbourhood, in the Gràcia district of Barcelona.The station is served by line L3.

The station opened in 1985, when the section of line L3 between Lesseps and Montbau stations was opened.

The station is located underneath Avinguda de Vallcarca (formerly known as the Avinguda de l'Hospital Militar),  between Carrer del Gòlgota, Barcelona and Carrer d'Anna Piferrer, and can be accessed from entrances in the former and the latter, leading to a single ticket hall.

See also
List of Barcelona Metro stations

References

External links

Trenscat.com

Barcelona Metro line 3 stations
Railway stations in Spain opened in 1985
Transport in Gràcia